The 2001 season was the St. Louis Rams' 65th in the National Football League (NFL), their seventh in St. Louis and their second under head coach Mike Martz. The Rams improved on their 10–6 record from last year, and finished 14–2. In going 14–2, the Rams finished in first place in the NFC West, and first place in the whole NFL. The St. Louis Rams in 2001 set a franchise record for wins in a season (14), while also going a perfect 8–0 on the road. Quarterback Kurt Warner would go on to win his second league MVP award. Along with Warner's 1999 MVP award and Marshall Faulk's 2000 award, the Rams had amassed the last three NFL MVP awards.

The Rams also became the first team in NFL history to open three consecutive seasons with six straight wins and the first to score 500 or more points in three consecutive seasons.

The Rams returned to the Super Bowl for a second time after winning their first title two years earlier, but this time against the 11–5 New England Patriots, led by second-year head coach Bill Belichick and by a young Tom Brady. The Rams were expected by many to win their 2nd Super Bowl title, but lost 20–17 after Patriots placekicker Adam Vinatieri kicked the game-clinching field goal after both teams were tied 17-17. This was the Rams' last Super Bowl appearance until the 2018 season, when they controversially defeated the New Orleans Saints 26–23 in the NFC Championship game, and would meet the New England Patriots in Super Bowl LIII in a rematch of Super Bowl XXXVI, but lost 13–3. By that time, the Rams would be based in Los Angeles after relocating from St. Louis in 2016.

This was also the final season with the Rams as "The Greatest Show on Turf" as Kurt Warner struggled the following two seasons with the team. He was then replaced by Marc Bulger.

Offseason

With one of the worst defenses in the NFL in 2000 (allowing 471 points), the Rams knew an overhaul was needed in this area.  First, Lovie Smith was hired away from the Tampa Bay Buccaneers to serve as defensive coordinator.  Smith brought some of his key contributors from the 1999 Tampa Bay Buccaneers team, who the Rams beat in the NFC Championship Game, namely linebacker Don Davis and defensive linemen Chidi Ahanotu and Tyoka Jackson.  Linebacker Mark Fields, who led the 2000 New Orleans Saints in tackles, and defensive back Kim Herring, a key member of the defending Super Bowl champion Baltimore Ravens defense, were both acquired via trade or free agency.  The Rams had three first-round draft picks, and all were used on defense.  Defensive tackles Damione Lewis and Ryan Pickett, and Adam Archuleta, a linebacker at Arizona State who would be converted to strong safety, were all drafted, along with Florida State linebacker Tommy Polley in the third round.  All would be key contributors.

The most important acquisition (other than Smith), however, was the trade for veteran cornerback Aeneas Williams.  Williams' leadership was the key element in a much-improved Rams defense in 2001.

NFL draft

Free agents

Personnel

Staff

Regular season

Schedule

Postseason

Standings

Roster

Playoffs

Divisional Round vs. Packers

The matchup between two of the league's highly rated quarterbacks — the Packers' Brett Favre and the Rams Kurt Warner, who shared a combined total of five NFL MVP awards, became lopsided thanks to St. Louis' improved defense, which forced 8 turnovers. Although Favre threw for 281 yards, he tied a playoff record by tossing six interceptions, three of which were returned for touchdowns. The Packers generated most of their offense early in the contest, but the turnovers gave the Rams a 24–10 halftime lead. The Rams then returned two interceptions in the second half to put the game away.

Rams defensive back Aeneas Williams opened up the scoring by returning an interception from Favre 29 yards for a touchdown. The next time Green Bay had the ball, they turned it over again when safety Kim Herring stripped the ball from Ahman Green and rookie Adam Archuleta recovered it. However, the Rams were unable to take advantage of this turnover. A few plays later, Warner's pass was intercepted by Darren Sharper on the Packers 35-yard line. Favre then completed a pair of passes to Corey Bradford and Donald Driver for gains of 27 and 16 yards, before tying the game with a 22-yard touchdown pass to Antonio Freeman. But the Rams stormed right back with a 15-yard completion to Az-Zahir Hakim and a 38-yard burst from running back Marshall Faulk advancing the ball to the Packers 11-yard line. Two plays later, Warner completed a 4-yard touchdown pass to Torry Holt to put the Rams back in the lead. Then on Green Bay's next drive, Herring intercepted a pass from Favre and returned it 45 yards to the Packers 4-yard line, setting up a 4-yard touchdown catch by fullback James Hodgins early in the second quarter.  Allen Rossum returned the ensuing kickoff 95 yards for a touchdown, but a holding penalty on Torrance Marshall eliminated the score. Green Bay still managed to score with a Ryan Longwell field goal, but Rams kicker Jeff Wilkins responded with a field goal of his own to give the Rams a 24–10 halftime lead.

In the second half, the Rams scored two touchdowns in a span of 92 seconds. On Green Bay's opening drive, Green's 49-yard run moved the ball into Rams territory. But on the three plays later, Williams stripped the ball from Freeman, dove on it, then got up and returned it for a touchdown. A replay challenge overruled the score, showing Williams was down by contact when he recovered the fumble, but three plays later, Holt's 50-yard reception set up a 7-yard touchdown run by Faulk. Then on Green Bay's next possession, Rams lineman Grant Wistrom deflected a pass from Favre into the arms of linebacker Tommy Polley, who returned the interception 34 yards for a touchdown.

In fourth quarter, the Rams defense scored again with another interception return from Williams, making him the first player ever to return two interceptions for touchdowns in a playoff game. Meanwhile, they managed to pin down the Packers, only allowing a meaningless score on an 8-yard touchdown pass from Favre to Freeman with 5:46 left in the game.

Scoring
STL – Williams 29 yard interception return (Wilkins kick) STL 7–0
GB – Freeman 22 yard pass from Favre (Longwell kick) Tie 7–7
STL – Holt 4 yard pass from Warner (Wilkins kick) STL 14–7
STL – Hodgins 4 yard pass from Warner (Wilkins kick) STL 21–7
GB – field goal Longwell 28 yards STL 21–10
STL – field goal Wilkins 27 yards STL 24–10
STL – Faulk 7 yard run (Wilkins kick) STL 31–10
STL – Polley 34 yard interception return (Wilkins kick) STL 38–10
STL – Williams 32 yard interception return (Wilkins kick) STL 45–10
GB – Freeman 8 yard from Favre (Longwell kick) STL 45–17

NFC Championship Game vs. Eagles

The Eagles had a 17–13 lead at halftime, and had not allowed more than 21 points per game during the season and playoffs. But the Rams roared back thanks to Kurt Warner completing two-thirds of his passes for 212 yards and Marshall Faulk's 159 yards rushing and two touchdowns to earn their second trip to the Super Bowl in three years.

Early in the first quarter, Donovan McNabb fumbled while being sacked by defensive end Leonard Little, and Brian Young recovered for the Rams at the Philadelphia 20-yard line. Five plays later, Warner threw a 5-yard touchdown pass to Isaac Bruce. Philadelphia responded with an 11-play, 50-yard drive, featuring a 20-yard run by Duce Staley, that ended with a 46-yard field goal by David Akers. Rams receiver Yo Murphy returned the ensuing kickoff 43 yards his own 42-yard line before Warner completed a 20-yard pass to Az-Zahir Hakim and Faulk rushed for 15 yards to set up a 27-yard field from Jeff Wilkins, giving the Rams a 10–3 lead.

Early in the second quarter, Wilkins hit the crossbar on a 53-yard field goal attempt, and the Eagles took over on their 43-yard line. On the next play, rookie running back Correll Buckhalter broke off a 31-yard run to the St. Louis 26. A few plays later, Staley finished the drive with a 1-yard touchdown run to tie the game. But on the Rams next drive, a 31-yard run by Faulk set up 39-yard field goal by Wilkins, and the Rams retook the lead. But they didn't hold it. McNabb responded with 2 completions to James Thrash for 27 yards and a 12-yard throw to Chad Lewis before throwing a 12-yard touchdown pass to Todd Pinkston with 46 seconds left in the half.

But St. Louis dominated the Eagles in third quarter, holding the ball for 12:30 and limiting Philadelphia to just five offensive plays. Murphy fumbled the opening kickoff, but Rams rookie Nick Sorensen recovered it. Following seven runs by Faulk for 27 yards, Warner completed a 21-yard pass to Torry Holt at the Eagles 19-yard line, setting up Wilkins' third field goal to cut their deficit to 17–16. Then after forcing a three-and-out, the Rams drove 71 yards in 10 plays, with Warner completing three passes to Bruce for 44 yards and a 16-yard pass to Holt at the Eagles 9-yard line. Faulk subsequently took the ball into the end zone with three consecutive running plays, giving the Rams a 22–17 lead after tight end Ernie Conwell dropped Warner's pass on a two-point conversion attempt.

Philadelphia went three-and-out again on its next two possessions, and Faulk took advantage of an Eagles' defense that was on the field for most of the second half. On the Rams drive after the second punt, he broke a 25-yard run on third down and 1, caught a 10-yard pass, and then ran for 8 yards before finally scoring a 1-yard touchdown run to increase the Rams lead to 29–17 with 6:55 left in the game. But a 41-yard kickoff return to the Rams 48-yard line from Brian Mitchell sparked an Eagles rally. McNabb led the Eagles 52 yards, completing an 11-yard pass to Chad Lewis on fourth down and 8 and a 17-yard pass to Thrash before taking the ball across the goal line himself on a 3-yard run. After forcing a punt, the Eagles got the ball back on their own 45-yard line with 2:20 left. But on a fourth down and 7 conversion attempt, St. Louis defensive back Aeneas Williams intercepted a pass intended for Freddie Mitchell and the Rams held the ball for the next two minutes, giving the Eagles one more chance to win. Taking a play that the Giants had run against them in Week 16, the Eagles ran a hook and lateral.  The Rams quickly stopped the play to win the game.

Scoring
STL – Bruce 5 yard pass from Warner (Wilkins kick) STL 7–0
PHI – field goal Akers 46 yards STL 7–3
STL – field goal Wilkins 27 yards STL 10–3
PHI – Staley 1 yard run (Akers kick) Tie 10–10
STL – field goal Wilkins 39 yards STL 13–10
PHI – Pinkston 12 yard pass from McNabb (Akers kick) PHI 17–13
STL – field goal Wilkins 41 yards PHI 17–16
STL – Faulk 1 yard run (Two-point conversion failed) STL 22–17
STL – Faulk 1 yard run (Wilkins kick) STL 29–17
PHI – McNabb 3 yard run (Akers kick) STL 29–24

Super Bowl XXXVI vs. New England Patriots

The Patriots dispensed with the traditional individual player introductions, choosing to enter the stadium as a team. Even though the Rams outgained the Patriots 427–267 in total yards, New England forced three turnovers and converted them into 17 points, while committing no turnovers themselves.

The Rams scored first midway through the first quarter, driving 48 yards in 10 plays to set up a 50-yard field goal by kicker Jeff Wilkins. The rest of the quarter was scoreless as both teams' defenses took control. Early in the second quarter, the Rams drove to New England's 34-yard line, but quarterback Kurt Warner threw an incompletion on third down, and Wilkins' subsequent 52-yard field goal attempt sailed wide left.

In the second quarter, with 8:49 left on the clock, New England defensive back Ty Law intercepted a pass intended for receiver Isaac Bruce and took off for a 47-yard touchdown return to give the Patriots a 7–3 lead. With less than two minutes left in the first half, Warner completed a pass to receiver Ricky Proehl at the Patriots 40-yard line, but New England defensive back Antwan Harris forced a fumble while tackling him. Patriots defensive back Terrell Buckley recovered the ball. New England quarterback Tom Brady would lead a drive that culminated with an 8-yard touchdown pass to receiver David Patten with just 31 seconds left in the half to give New England a 14–3 halftime lead. It was the first time during the entire season that St. Louis fell behind in a game by more than eight points.

The Patriots took the opening kickoff of the second half, but could only reach the St. Louis 43-yard line before being forced to punt. Aided by a 20-yard reception by wide receiver Az-Zahir Hakim, a 22-yard reception by Bruce, and a defensive pass interference penalty on Patriots defensive back Otis Smith, the Rams advanced to the New England 41-yard line. But on the next play, linebacker Mike Vrabel and defensive lineman Richard Seymour sacked Warner for a 9-yard loss. Warner then threw 2 consecutive incomplete passes, forcing the Rams to punt.

Later in the third quarter, Smith intercepted a pass intended for Rams wide receiver Torry Holt after Holt slipped while coming off the line of scrimmage, and returned the ball 30 yards to the Rams 33-yard line. St. Louis' defense kept the Patriots out of the end zone, but kicker Adam Vinatieri made a 37-yard field goal to increase New England's lead to 17–3.

The Rams responded by driving to the Patriots' 3-yard line on their ensuing drive. On fourth-and-goal, the Rams decided to go for the touchdown with a quarterback sneak by Warner. However, Warner fumbled the ball while being tackled by linebacker Roman Phifer. Defensive back Tebucky Jones recovered the fumble and returned it 97 yards for an apparent touchdown that would have increased the Patriots lead to 24–3. However, the play was nullified by a holding penalty on linebacker Willie McGinest, giving the Rams a first down on the 1-yard line instead. New England kept the Rams out of the end zone for one more play, but Warner scored on a second down, 2-yard touchdown run to cut the deficit to 17–10.

After Warner's touchdown, the Rams defense forced the Patriots to a three-and-out. St. Louis then drove from their own 7-yard line to the New England 36-yard line, aided by a 30-yard reception by Proehl. However, McGinest sacked Warner for a 16-yard loss on second down, pushing the Rams back to their 46-yard line. St. Louis ended up punting after Warner's third down pass was incomplete.

The Rams forced New England to another three-and-out, and they got the ball back on their own 45-yard line with 1:51 left in the game. Warner threw three consecutive completions: an 18-yard pass to Hakim, an 11-yard one to receiver Yo Murphy, and finally a 26-yard touchdown completion to Proehl to tie the game 17–17 with 1:30 left in the fourth quarter.

The Patriots had no timeouts left for their ensuing drive, causing color commentator John Madden to famously declare that the Patriots should run out the clock and go to overtime. Instead, New England decided to go for the win, as Brady opened the drive with three completions to running back J.R. Redmond, which moved the ball to their 41-yard line with 33 seconds left. After an incomplete pass, Brady completed a 23-yard pass to wide receiver Troy Brown, and followed it up with a 6-yard completion to tight end Jermaine Wiggins to advance to the Rams' 30-yard line. Brady then spiked the ball with seven seconds left, setting up Vinatieri's 48-yard field goal attempt. Vinatieri's game-winning kick sailed through the uprights as time expired, marking the first time in Super Bowl history that a game had been won by a score on the final play.

Warner finished the game with 28 completions out of 44 passes for 365 yards, 1 touchdown, and 2 interceptions, and rushed 3 times for 6 yards and a touchdown. Warner's 365 passing yards were the second highest total in Super Bowl history behind his own record of 414 yards set in Super Bowl XXXIV. Hakim was the top receiver of the game with 5 catches for 90 yards, and also rushed once for 5 yards. Rams running back Marshall Faulk led the team with 76 rushing yards, and also caught 4 passes for 54 yards. Patriots running back Antowain Smith was the top rusher of the game with 92 yards, and caught a pass for 4 yards. Troy Brown was the Patriots leading receiver with 6 catches for 89 yards, a 15-yard kickoff return, and a 4-yard punt return, giving him 108 total yards.

Awards and records
 Marshall Faulk, Bert Bell Award
 Marshall Faulk, Daniel F. Reeves Memorial Award
 Marshall Faulk, National Football League Offensive Player of the Year Award
 Marshall Faulk, All-Pro Selection
 Marshall Faulk, Pro Bowl Selection 
 Kurt Warner, Pro Bowl Selection 
 Kurt Warner, All Pro Selection
 Issac Bruce, Pro Bowl Selection 
 Torry Holt, Pro Bowl Selection 
 Aeneas Williams, All Pro Selection
 Aeneas Williams, Pro Bowl Selection 
 Orlando Pace, All Pro Selection 
 Orlando Pace, Pro Bowl Selection 
 Adam Timmerman, Pro Bowl Selection

Notes and references

St. Louis Rams
St. Louis Rams seasons
NFC West championship seasons
National Football Conference championship seasons
St Louis